Sir Walter Leonard  Allinson  (1 May 1926 – 28 December 2022) was a British civil servant and diplomat.

Allinson was born on 1 May 1926, the only son of Walter Allinson and Alice Frances Cassidy of Tottenham, and educated at Friern Barnet Grammar School and Merton College, Oxford, graduating in 1944. In 1951 he married Margaret Patricia Watts.

During his career, Allinson served as Principal at the British Ministry of Education (1948–58), First Secretary in Lahore and Karachi, Pakistan (1960–62), First Secretary in Madras and New Delhi, India (1963–66), Deputy High Commissioner, Nairobi, Kenya (1970–73), Deputy High Commissioner and Minister, New Delhi (1975–77), High Commissioner, Lusaka (Zambia) (1978–80) and High Commissioner in Kenya and Ambassador to UN Environment Programme (1982–86).

In recognition of his contributions to Her Majesty the Queen's Diplomatic Service, Allinson was awarded a knighthood—a KCVO—in 1979, having previously been awarded an MVO in 1961 and had a CMG conferred upon him in 1976.

Allinson died on 28 December 2022, at the age of 96.

Arms 
Allinson was granted arms by Letters Patent of Garter and Clarenceux Kings of Arms, from the College of Arms, dated 8 June 2018 with the following blazoning: "Arms: Azure three Chevronels interlaced Argent on a Chief wavy Or three Lime Trees eradicated proper. Crest: Upon a Helm with a Wreath Or and Azure A demi Asian Black Bear proper playing a Set of Bagpipes Or the cords Sable the bag in Gordon tartan also proper. Mantled Azure doubled Or."

References

External links
Interview with Sir Walter Leonard Allinson - transcript, British Diplomatic Oral History Programme, Churchill College, Cambridge, 1996

1926 births
2022 deaths
Alumni of Merton College, Oxford
Companions of the Order of St Michael and St George
Knights Commander of the Royal Victorian Order
Members of HM Diplomatic Service
Civil servants in the Department of Education (United Kingdom)
High Commissioners of the United Kingdom to Kenya
High Commissioners of the United Kingdom to Zambia
People educated at Friern Barnet Grammar School
20th-century British diplomats